Zelenogorsk is a closed town in Krasnoyarsk Krai, Russia, located on the left bank of the Kan River  above its confluence with the Yenisei River. It was formerly known as Krasnoyarsk-45 and was involved in enriching uranium for the Soviet nuclear program. Population:

History
It was granted town status in 1956.

As a closed town, it went under the code-name Krasnoyarsk-45 until Russian President Boris Yeltsin decreed, in 1992, that such cities could use their historical names. The town appeared on no official maps until then. As is the tradition with Soviet towns containing secret facilities, the designation "Krasnoyarsk-45" is actually a postcode; it implied that the place was located directly in the city of Krasnoyarsk, but really  from it.
The city still remains closed, by a vote of the inhabitants. Access is possible only by having a special entry permit issued by the city's authorities.

Administrative and municipal status
Within the framework of administrative divisions, it is incorporated as the closed administrative-territorial formation of Zelenogorsk—an administrative unit with the status equal to that of the districts. As a municipal division, the closed administrative-territorial formation of Zelenogorsk is incorporated as Zelenogorsk Urban Okrug.

International relations
It is a sister city with Newburyport, Massachusetts, United States.

References

Notes

Sources

Cities and towns in Krasnoyarsk Krai
Closed cities
Naukograds